Gabriel Pometcu (born 23 July 1947) is a Romanian boxer. He competed in the men's featherweight event at the 1972 Summer Olympics.

References

External links
 

1947 births
Living people
Romanian male boxers
Olympic boxers of Romania
Boxers at the 1972 Summer Olympics
Sportspeople from Bucharest
Featherweight boxers